Mark Andrew Green (born June 1, 1960) is an American politician and diplomat who is the president, director and CEO of the Woodrow Wilson International Center for Scholars. Before joining the Wilson Center on March 15, 2021, he served as the executive director of the McCain Institute for International Leadership, and prior to that, as the Administrator of the United States Agency for International Development. He served in the Wisconsin State Assembly from 1993 to 1999, was a Republican member of the United States House of Representatives from 1999 to 2007, representing , ran unsuccessfully for governor of Wisconsin in 2006, and held the post of United States Ambassador to Tanzania from August 2007 until January 2009. Green served as president of the International Republican Institute from 2014 to 2017 and sits on the board of directors of the Millennium Challenge Corporation.

The United States Senate confirmed Green as administrator of the USAID on August 3, 2017. He was sworn in the following August 7. On March 16, 2020, Green submitted a resignation letter to President Trump. He left the office on April 10, 2020.

Early life and education
Green was born in Boston, Massachusetts, to Jeremy and Elizabeth Green. His father is from South Africa, and Green spent time there as a child. His family moved often, and as a child he lived in Jersey City, New Jersey; Cincinnati, Ohio; England; South Africa; and Australia. He attended Abbot Pennings High School in De Pere, Wisconsin.

Green received a bachelor's degree from the University of Wisconsin–Eau Claire in 1983 and a Juris Doctor from the University of Wisconsin–Madison in 1987. In law school, he served as a managing editor of the Wisconsin Law Review and won the Justice Robert Jackson Award from the Washington, D.C., Foreign Law Society for "Best Published Student Writing on a Foreign Law Subject".

Career 
After graduating from law school, he joined the law firm Godfrey & Kahn S.C. at their Green Bay, Wisconsin office.

Wisconsin State Assembly 
In 1992, Green was elected to the Wisconsin State Assembly, where he served District 4 for six years and rose to the position of chairman of the Republican Caucus. He chaired the Judiciary Committee, served on the Board of the Wisconsin Housing and Economic Development Authority (WHEDA), and helped reform state housing policy. Green's legislative work won him awards from the Wisconsin and American Farm Bureau Federations, the United States Chamber of Commerce, the National Federation of Independent Business, the National Rifle Association, the Wisconsin Builders Association, the Wisconsin Medical Society, Citizens Against Government Waste, Watchdogs of the Treasury, and the Seniors Coalition.

U.S. House of Representatives 
Green first ran for Congress in 1998, defeating first-term Representative Jay W. Johnson, with 54% of the vote. Green won each of his next three elections with 70% or more of the vote. He represented Wisconsin's 8th congressional district from the 106th Congress until the 109th Congress.

Green was a member of the House International Relations Committee in the 107th to 109th sessions of Congress. He helped draft the Millennium Challenge Act, the Global Access to HIV/AIDS Prevention, Awareness and Treatment Act of 2001, and the U.S. Leadership Against HIV/AIDS, Tuberculosis and Malaria Act. He co-founded the Victory in Iraq Caucus.

Green worked to raise awareness about human rights violations by the communist Pathet Lao government in Laos against the ethnic minority Hmong people and others suffering under authoritarian governments, and about religious freedom issues in Laos and Southeast Asia. Many Hmong Americans had resettled in Wisconsin as political refugees following the Vietnam War.

In January 1999, Green was appointed an Assistant Majority Whip by then-House Majority Whip Tom DeLay, and then re-appointed by House Majority Whip Roy Blunt.

While a U.S. Representative, Green was a member of the House Judiciary Committee, vice chair of the Crime, Terrorism and Homeland Security Subcommittee, and co-founded the bipartisan Faith-Based Caucus. He co-led the floor debate on the "Faith-Based Initiative", a plan to reenlist faith-based communities in the national fight against poverty and social crises. As part of that effort, he co-founded the bipartisan Faith-Based Caucus. Green helped expand the Violence Against Women Act, and wrote the "Two Strikes and You're Out Child Protection Act", which would have established a mandatory sentence of life imprisonment for twice-convicted child sex offenders. He also cosponsored the Debbie Smith Act, which was meant to assist law enforcement in modernizing DNA databases, and the Adam Walsh Child Protection and Safety Act. He supported the death penalty and the No Child Left Behind Act.

2006 Wisconsin gubernatorial campaign 

Green unsuccessfully ran for Governor of Wisconsin against incumbent Governor Jim Doyle, a Democrat. Green had no opponent in the Republican Party primary. Then-Milwaukee County Executive Scott Walker dropped out of the GOP primary on March 24, 2006, citing a lack of campaign funds (he would later win the governorship in 2010). After the primary, Green was joined on the ticket by State Rep. Jean Hundertmark of Clintonville, who had defeated Nick Voegeli in the primary for lieutenant governor. Green received 979,427 votes to Doyle's 1,139,115 votes.

U.S. Ambassador to Tanzania 

On June 8, 2007, President George W. Bush announced Green's nomination as United States Ambassador to Tanzania. Senator Russ Feingold, chairman of the African Affairs Subcommittee of the Senate Foreign Relations Committee, held hearings on Green's nomination as ambassador on June 19.

Senator Chris Dodd, a member of the Senate Foreign Relations Committee, put a hold on Green's nomination to replace Michael Retzer as ambassador, citing Retzer's action of revoking the country clearance of Peace Corps Country Director Christine Djondo as interference in the independence of the Peace Corps. On June 28, when the State Department provided a letter of apology to Djondo, Dodd released his hold. On August 3, 2007, the Senate confirmed Green by unanimous consent. He resigned as ambassador to Tanzania upon Barack Obama's inauguration as president.

Tenure 

During Green's tenure, President George W. Bush visited Tanzania in February 2008, the first official visit by a sitting U.S. president; Tanzania hosted Sullivan Summit VIII, the first Sullivan Summit in East Africa; President Kikwete visited the White House in August 2008; and the largest Millennium Challenge Corporation (MCC) Compact in history was signed.

During his tenure, Green helped craft the Millennium Challenge Act, which expanded America's commitment to invest in developing nations that are pursuing political and economic reforms. He worked to enact the Global Access to HIV/AIDS Prevention, Awareness and Treatment Act of 2001 and the U.S. Leadership Against HIV/AIDS, Tuberculosis and Malaria Act. He worked on legislation covering policy areas like international terrorism and human trafficking. In 2005, Green worked with the National Democratic Institute for International Affairs, the International Republican Institute and the State Department as an election observer in Kenya. He also traveled to West Africa with the Academy for Educational Development, Oxfam and Save the Children to work on programs related to women's health and education.

Nongovernmental Organization (NGO) work 
Green was a director of the policy center of Malaria No More, a global effort to eliminate malaria.

He served as a senior director of the U.S. Global Leadership Coalition (USGLC) from 2011 until his appointment in 2017. USGLC is a foreign policy foundation that describes itself as "a broad-based influential network of over 500 businesses and NGOs; national security and foreign policy experts; and business, faith-based, academic, military, and community leaders in all 50 states who support strategic investments to elevate development and diplomacy alongside defense in order to build a better, safer world".

He served as president and CEO of Initiative for Global Development, a nonprofit organization aimed at reducing world poverty, from 2013 to 2014.

From 2014-2017, Green served as president of the International Republican Institute (IRI), an NGO chaired by the late Arizona Sen. John McCain.

Administrator of USAID

Nomination
In May 2017, Green was nominated by President Donald Trump to lead the United States Agency for International Development. His nomination was backed by aid organizations and politicians, with The Guardian writing that Green "is well regarded and known for his bipartisan approach to foreign assistance".

Personal life 
Mark and Susan (née Keske) Green wed on August 5, 1985, and have three children. Green and his wife served as volunteer teachers in Kenya with WorldTeach in 1987 and 1988, and while in Kenya, visited rural areas of neighboring countries.

Electoral history

References

External links

 USAID profile
 

|-

|-

|-

|-

|-

1960 births
Living people
21st-century American politicians
Administrators of the United States Agency for International Development
Ambassadors of the United States to Tanzania
American people of South African descent
George W. Bush administration personnel
International Republican Institute
Republican Party members of the Wisconsin State Assembly
Notre Dame Academy (Green Bay, Wisconsin) alumni
Republican Party members of the United States House of Representatives from Wisconsin
Trump administration personnel
University of Wisconsin–Eau Claire alumni
University of Wisconsin Law School alumni